Sonari is the largest residential area in the city of Jamshedpur, which is also served by Sonari Airport (IATA: IXW, ICAO: VEJS). Domuhani bridge in Marine Drive connects Sonari with NH-33. The area is easily accessible through Marine Drive (Western Corridor) from Adityapur, Kadma, which also connects it with the Northern towns of Sakchi and Bistupur.

Apart from the residential area, there is a large area of green cover. One can take in nature's beauty where the Subarnarekha and Kharkhai rivers meet at Domuhani.

Residential 
Sonari has Ashiana Gardens by Ashiana Housing.
 Jamshedpur